Raphitomidae  is a family of small to medium-sized sea snails, marine gastropod mollusks in the superfamily Conoidea.

Bouchet, Kantor et al. elevated in 2011 the subfamily Raphitominae (which at that point had been placed in the family Conidae) to the rank of family. This was based on a cladistical analysis of shell morphology, radular characteristics, anatomical characters, and a dataset of molecular sequences of three gene fragments. The family was found to be monophyletic.

Description
The Raphitomidae is the largest, most diverse and most variable taxon in the Conoidea, with the greatest number of species and the largest ecological range (from the tropics to the pole) and largest vertical range (intertidal to hadal depths).

The shells of species in the Raphitomidae are very variable in shape (buccinoid to ovate, elongate-fusiform, or high-cylindrical) and size (2 to 140mm in height).  Similarly, shell sculpture is extremely variable, from nearly smooth to well developed spiral and axial elements and subsutural ramps.  Common morphology includes apertural armature rarely well developed, inner lip usually smooth, no operculum, radular tooth hypodermic in character with marginal teeth of variable morphology (including variable length).

The muscular bulb of the venom gland is always single-layered. The close relationship of Raphitomidae with cone snails (which are already under intensive study for the pharmaceutical applications of their toxins), makes them an interesting candidate for the discovery of new toxins.

Another characteristic is the multispiral protoconch, which shows spiral striae on protoconch I and diagonally cancellated ("raphitomine") sculpture on protoconch II.

Some species with a paucispiral protoconch are included in the family. This is usually based on similarities in shell morphology to
species having a "raphitomine" protoconch. This determination should also ideally be founded on other attributes, such as the type of radula or foregut anatomy or their lack of an operculum.

Genera
This is a list of the accepted names of genera in the family Raphitomidae (the main reference for recent species is the World Register of Marine Species)

 Abyssobela Kantor & Sysoev, 1986
 Abyssothauma Sysoev, 1996
 Acamptodaphne Shuto, 1971
 Acanthodaphne Bonfitto & Morassi, 2006
 Aliceia Dautzenberg & H. Fischer, 1897
 Aplotoma gen. nov. 
 Asperdaphne Hedley, 1922
 Austrobela gen. nov. 
 Austrodaphnella Laseron, 1954
 Austropusilla Laseron, 1954
 Austrotheta gen. nov. 
 † Awheaturris Beu, 1970
 Azorilla F. Nordsieck, 1968; synonym of Teretia Norman, 1888.
 Bathybela Kobelt, 1905
 Buccinaria Kittl, 1887
 Biconitoma gen. nov. 
 Clathromangelia Monterosato, 1884
 Clinura Bellardi, 1875
 Cryptodaphne Powell, 1942
 Cyrillia Kobelt, 1905
 Daphnella Hinds, 1844
 Diaugasma Melvill, 1917 
 Eubela Dall, 1889
 Eucyclotoma Boettger, 1895
 Exomilus Hedley, 1918
 Famelica Bouchet & Warén, 1980
 Favriella Hornung, 1920
 Fusobela gen. nov. 
 Glaciotomella gen. nov. 
 Gladiobela gen. nov. 
 Globodaphne gen. nov. 
 Glyphostomoides Shuto, 1983
 Gymnobela Verrill, 1884
 Hemilienardia Boettger, 1895
 † Hokianga Laws, 1947 
 Isodaphne Laseron, 1954
 Kermia Oliver, 1915
 Kuroshiodaphne Shuto, 1965
 Leiosyrinx Bouchet & A. Sysoev, 2001
 Leufroyia Monterosato, 1884
 Lusitanops F. Nordsieck, 1968
 † Maoridaphne Powell, 1942 
 Microdaphne McLean, 1971
 Microgenia Laseron, 1954
 Mioawateria Vella, 1954
 Neopleurotomoides Shuto, 1971
 Nepotilla Hedley, 1918
 Nodothauma gen. nov. 
 † Onoketoma Beu, 2011 
 Pagodibela gen. nov. 
 Pagodidaphne Shuto, 1983
 Paramontana Laseron, 1954
 Phymorhynchus Dall, 1908
 Pleurotomella Verrill, 1872
 Pontiothauma E.A. Smith, 1895
 Pseudodaphnella Boettger, 1895
 † Pseudolusitanops Lozouet, 2017 
 Pueridaphne gen. nov. 
 † Puha Marwick, 1931  
 Raphitoma Bellardi, 1847 
 Rimosodaphnella Cossmann, 1916
 Rocroithys Sysoev & Bouchet, 2001 
 Spergo Dall, 1895 
 Stilla Finlay, 1926 
 Taranidaphne Morassi & Bonfitto, 2001 
 Taranis Jeffreys, 1870 
 Teleochilus Harris, 1897 
 Teretia Norman, 1888 
 Teretiopsis Kantor & Sysoev, 1989  
 Thatcheria Angas, 1877 
 Thatcheriasyrinx Powell, 1969 
 Thatcherina Vera-Pelaez, 1998 
 Thesbia Jeffreys, 1867 
 Theta A.H. Clarke, 1959 
 Thetidos Hedley, 1899  - as a separate genus or as a synonym of Lienardia
 Tritonoturris Dall, 1924
 Trochodaphne gen. nov. 
 Truncadaphne McLean, 1971
 Tuskaroria Sysoev, 1988 
 Typhlosyrinx Thiele, 1925 
 Veprecula Melvill, 1917 
 Vepridaphne Shuto, 1983
 Vitjazinella Sysoev, 1988 
 Xanthodaphne Powell, 1942
 Zenepos Finlay, 1926

Genera which have been brought into synonymy

 Allo Jousseaume, 1934: synonym of Taranis Jeffreys, 1870 
 Anomalotomella Powell, 1966: synonym of Pleurotomella Verrill, 1872
 Aspertilla Powell, 1944: synonym of Asperdaphne Hedley, 1922
 Azorita F. Nordsieck, 1968: synonym of Pleurotomella Verrill, 1872
 Bathypota F. Nordsieck, 1968: synonym of Bathybela Kobelt, 1905
 Cenodagreutes E.H. Smith, 1967: synonym of Raphitoma Bellardi, 1847 
 Cirillia Monterosato, 1884: synonym of Philbertia Monterosato, 1884
 Clathurina Melvill, 1917 : synonym of Kermia Oliver, 1915
 Cochlioconus Yokoyama, 1928: synonym of Thatcheria Angas, 1877 
 Cordiera: synonym of Cordieria Rouault, 1848
 Cyrtoides F. Nordsieck, 1968: synonym of Raphitoma Bellardi, 1847 
 Eudaphne Bartsch, 1931: synonym of Daphnella Hinds, 1844
 Eudaphnella Bartsch, 1933: synonym of Daphnella Hinds, 1844
 Feliciella Lamy, 1934: synonym of Taranis Jeffreys, 1870 
 Fenestrosyrinx Finlay, 1926 : synonym of Taranis Jeffreys, 1870 
 Fusidaphne Laseron, 1954: synonym of Pleurotomella Verrill, 1872 (synonym)
 Hemidaphne Hedley, 1918: synonym of Daphnella Hinds, 1844
 Homotoma Bellardi, 1875: synonym of Philbertia Monterosato, 1884
 Leufroyia Monterosato, 1884: synonym of Philbertia Monterosato, 1884
 Lineotoma F. Nordsieck, 1977: synonym of Philbertia Monterosato, 1884
 Litachilus Powell, 1944: synonym of Teleochilus Harris, 1897 
 Magnella Dittmer, 1960: synonym of Mioawateria Vella, 1954
 Majox F. Nordsieck, 1968: synonym of Gymnobela Verrill, 1884
 Metaclathurella Shuto, 1983: synonym of Otitoma Jousseaume, 1898
 Mordica Dall, 1924: synonym of Veprecula Melvill, 1917 
 Ootoma Koperberg, 1931: synonym of Buccinaria Kittl, 1887
 Ootomella Bartsch, 1933: synonym of Buccinaria Kittl, 1887
 Paradaphne Laseron, 1954: synonym of Daphnella Hinds, 1844
 Peratotoma Harris & Burrows, 1891: synonym of Philbertia Monterosato, 1884
 Philbertia Monterosato, 1884: synonym of Raphitoma Bellardi, 1847 
 Pionotoma Kuroda, 1952: synonym of Buccinaria Kittl, 1887
 Qii Zhang, 1995: synonym of Pseudodaphnella Boettger, 1895
 Rhaphitoma: synonym of Raphitoma Bellardi, 1848
 Speoides Kuroda & Habe, 1961: synonym of Spergo Dall, 1895 
 Teres Bucquoy, Dautzenberg & Dollfus, 1883: synonym of Teretia Norman, 1888 
 Tasmadaphne Laseron, 1954: synonym of Pleurotomella Verrill, 1872 (synonym)
 Turrhyssa Dall, 1924: synonym of Eucyclotoma Boettger, 1895
 Watsonaria F. Nordsieck, 1968: synonym of Gymnobela Verrill, 1884

References 

Vaught, K.C. (1989). A classification of the living Mollusca. American Malacologists: Melbourne, FL (USA). . XII, 195 pp
 Li, Baoquan, and Xinzheng Li. "Report on the Raphitomidae Bellardi, 1875 (Mollusca: Gastropoda: Conoidea) from the China Seas." Journal of natural history 48.17-18 (2014): 999-1025.
  M. Morassi  & A. Bonfitto: New raphitomine gastropods (Gastropoda: Conidae: Raphitominae) from the South-West Pacific; Zootaxa 2526: 54–68 (2010)
 Criscione, Francesco, et al. (2021)  "Where the snails have no name: a molecular phylogeny of Raphitomidae (Neogastropoda: Conoidea) uncovers vast unexplored diversity in the deep seas of temperate southern and eastern Australia." Zoological Journal of the Linnean Society 191(4):961-1000

External links
 Casey T.L. (1904) Notes on the Pleurotomidae with description of some new genera and species. Transactions of the Academy of Science of St. Louis, 14, 123–170
 
 Gastropods.com for images
 Worldwide Mollusc Species Data Base: Raphitomidae
 P. Bouchet and A. Sysoex, Typhlosyrinx-like tropical deep-water turriform gastropods (Mollusca, Gastropoda, Conoidea); JOURNAL OF NATURAL HISTORY, 2001, 35, p. 1693-1715
 Fedosov, Alexander E., and Nicolas Puillandre. "Phylogeny and taxonomy of the Kermia–Pseudodaphnella (Mollusca: Gastropoda: Raphitomidae) genus complex: a remarkable radiation via diversification of larval development." Systematics and Biodiversity 10.4 (2012): 447-477
 Fassio, Giulia, et al. "An assessment of Raphitoma and allied genera (Neogastropoda: Raphitomidae)." Journal of Molluscan Studies (2019)

 
Gastropod families